Sinno may refer to :

Sinni (river)
sinno family (Lebanese Family)